The 1994 Orkney Islands Council election, the sixth election to Orkney Islands Council, was held on 5 May 1994 as part of the wider 1994 Scottish regional elections. The election saw Independent candidates take all seats available, except for the ward of Kirkwall Pickaquoy, which had no nominations.

Aggregate Results

Ward Results

References

1994 Scottish local elections
May 1994 events in the United Kingdom